Vicente Magsaysay (January 20, 1940 – April 13, 2020) was a Filipino politician who was the chairman of the board of the Philippine Postal Savings Bank since January 22, 2009 until his death. He was governor of the province of Zambales from 1968 to 1986 and then again from 1998 to 2007. Magsaysay was the longest serving governor in the history of Zambales, serving for a total of 27 years.

Political career
Magsaysay was a veteran politician who was the nephew of former President Ramon Magsaysay. He first served as the governor of Zambales in 1968–1986, beginning before and lasting throughout the Marcos dictatorship. He lost the post after the People Power Revolution of 1986 that overthrew Ferdinand Marcos.

After losing the vice-presidential race under KBL of former first lady Imelda Marcos in 1992, he won re-election in the 1998 elections as governor of Zambales. He was re-elected in 2001 and 2004. He was the chairman of the board of the Philippine Postal Bank since January 22, 2009.

He accepted the nomination of Lakas–CMD to run in the May 14, 2007 midterm elections under the Team Unity umbrella. His name wasn't mentioned in any previous surveys before being selected on February 10, 2007.

He built the Jesus F. Magsaysay High School or Castillejos National High School in Castillejos, Zambales.

Personal life

GoVic or VicMag, as he was called, was married to Rosellyn Enciso (October 30, 1944 — August 9, 2014). His daughter Angel Magsaysay - Cheng was elected Vice Governor of Zambales 2016. His second daughter Mary Rose Magsaysay was appointed Undersecretary of Energy 2009-2010 and is currently a trustee of the Cultural Center of the Philippines.  Former Zambales first district Rep. Milagros "Mitos" Magsaysay is married to his eldest son Jesus "JV" Vicente. Other known relatives include Senator Ramon Magsaysay Jr., party-list Rep. Eulogio Magsaysay, and TV personality JB Magsaysay.

He died on 13 April 2020.

References

External links
Gawa, hindi ngawa ("Deeds, not sulking") - official/personal blog of Vic Magsaysay
Vic Magsaysay Friendster site
Vicente Magsaysay's Profile

1940 births
2020 deaths
Governors of Zambales
People from Zambales
Vicente
Nacionalista Party politicians
Kilusang Bagong Lipunan politicians
Lakas–CMD (1991) politicians
Lakas–CMD politicians
Candidates in the 1992 Philippine vice-presidential election
Heads of government-owned and controlled corporations of the Philippines
Arroyo administration personnel
Benigno Aquino III administration personnel
Duterte administration personnel